Bjerkøya is a populated island in the municipality of Sande, Norway. It has a population (SSB 2005) of 265.

Islands of Vestfold og Telemark